The Autostrada A5 (Italian) or Autoroute A5 (French) is an Italian motorway, which connects Turin and the Aosta Valley to France, through the Mont Blanc Tunnel.

Major Cities
A5 passes through Ivrea, Pont-Saint-Martin, Châtillon, Aosta and Courmayeur.

External links 
 ATIVA Autostrada Torino Ivrea Valle d'Aosta S.p.A.
 S.A.V. Società Autostrade Valdostane S.p.A.
 R.A.V Raccordo Autostradale Valle d'Aosta S.p.A.

A05
Transport in Piedmont
Transport in Aosta Valley
Transport infrastructure completed in 1961